Denmark sent two competitors to compete in two disciplines at the 2010 Winter Paralympics in Vancouver, British Columbia, Canada.

Biathlon

Cross-country skiing

See also
Denmark at the 2010 Winter Olympics

References

External links
Vancouver 2010 Paralympic Games official website
International Paralympic Committee official website

Nations at the 2010 Winter Paralympics
2010
2010 in Danish sport